Szidi Tobias (born 28 May 1967) is a Slovak actress and musician of Hungarian ancestry. While in her native country she successfully developed an acting career, in the Czech Republic Tobias established herself as a singer of urban chanson.

Discography

Studio albums
2001: Divý mak
2003: Punto Fijo
2008: Pod obojím
2010: Do vetra
2011: Ať se dobré děje
2014: Jolanka

EPs
2011: Vánoční koleda

Filmography

Cinema

Television

Notes
A  Denotes a televised theatre.
B  Denotes a TV series.

Radiography

Awards 

Notes
C  Slovak LitFond Rewards are usually given to a large number of actors and/or directors at the same time, each calendar year.
D  With difference of only point (16 points in total) won Edita Borsová for her role of Bety in Máša & Beta. Tobias received 15 points, while Jana Oľhová accumulated 10 points for her role of Arsinoé in Mizantrop.

See also

 List of Slovak submissions for the Academy Award for Best Foreign Language Film
 List of Czech submissions for the Academy Award for Best Foreign Language Film

References

General

 
 
 
Specific

External links 
 Szidi Tobias (official website)
 
 Szidi Tobias images by Google Images

 
1967 births
Living people
People from Trebišov District
Hungarians in Slovakia
20th-century Slovak actresses
Slovak film actresses
Slovak stage actresses
21st-century Slovak women singers
Slovak musicians
Cabaret singers
21st-century Slovak actresses